Skills Canada is a Canadian non-profit organization dedicated to the promotion of careers in technology and skilled trades. One of their major initiatives is the annual Skills Canada National Competition. This is an Olympic-style event in which competitors from across the country take part in various skilled trades and technology contests. Each Canadian province and territory has its own chapter of Skills Canada and they hold qualifying provincial competitions in their respective areas to determine their provincial and territorial candidates who will participate at the annual Canadian event.

Competitors may participate at either the secondary, post-secondary, or Team Canada level. The purpose of Skills Canada is to promote skilled careers in trades and technologies to youth and the future generation.

Canada is experiencing a shortage of skilled labourers, and Skills Canada hopes to fill in that gap. The baby boom generation has reached retirement age and the country is having difficulty retaining workers, adding to the shortage. Competitions are held at the provincial and territorial levels, with the best competitors from each province reaching the national event. Biannually, the top competitors in the country are invited to represent Canada at the WorldSkills competition, an international event hosted by WorldSkills International which is attended by competitors from over 80 member countries and regions.

Competition areas 
Areas of competition at the annual Skills Canada National Competition are divided into six sectors. These sectors and competitions are:

Construction Sector
Electrical Installations
Architectural Technology & Design
Brick Masonry
Cabinetmaking
Carpentry
Automation & Control
Landscape Gardening
Plumbing
Refrigeration & Air Conditioning
Sheet Metal Work
Welding
Steamfitter/Pipefitter
Sprinkler Systems

Employment Sector
Job interview
Job skill demonstration|Job Skill Demonstration
Public Speaking 
Workplace Safety
Job Search

Information Technology
2D & 3D Computer Animation
3D Digital Game Art
Electronics
Graphic Design
Web Design & Development
IT Network Systems Administrations
IT Office Software Applications
Video Production
Mechanical CADD
Architectural Technology & Design
Photography

Manufacturing and Engineering Sector
CNC Machining
Industrial Mechanic/Millwright
Mechatronics
Precision Machining
Mobile Robotics
Mechatronics

Services Sector
Baking
Cooking
Hairstyling
Aesthetics
Fashion Technology

Transportation Sector
Aerospace Technology
Automotive Service
Autobody Repair 
Car Painting
Heavy Equipment Service
Outdoor Power & Recreation Equipment

Competitions 
To date, 27 Skills Canada National Competitions have been held. In 2020 the event had been scheduled to be held in Vancouver, British Columbia but it was cancelled owing to the COVID-19 pandemic. The next competition will be held in Winnipeg, Manitoba in 2023.

References

External links
 Official website

Educational organizations based in Canada